Admontia is a genus of parasitic flies in the family Tachinidae.  Larvae are parasitoids of larval crane flies.

Species
Admontia antractica (Thomson, 1869)
Admontia badiceps Reinhard, 1958
Admontia blanda (Fallén, 1820)
Admontia cepelaki (Mesnil, 1961)
Admontia communis Aldrich, 1934
Admontia continuans Strobl, 1910
Admontia debilis Aldrich, 1934
Admontia degeerioides (Coquillett, 1895)
Admontia delicatula (Mesnil, 1963)
Admontia discalis Aldrich, 1934
Admontia dubia Curran, 1927
Admontia ducalis Reinhard, 1958
Admontia duospinosa (West, 1925)
Admontia finisterrae Cortés, 1986
Admontia flavibasis Aldrich, 1934
Admontia gracilipes Mesnil, 1953
Admontia grandicornis (Zetterstedt, 1849)
Admontia longicornis Yang Longlong & Chao Chienming, 1990
Admontia maculisquama (Zetterstedt, 1859)
Admontia malayana (Townsend, 1926)
Admontia nasoni Coquillett, 1895
Admontia nigrita Thompson, 1968
Admontia occidentalis Wulp, 1892
Admontia offella Reinhard, 1962
Admontia pergandei Coquillett, 1895
Admontia pictiventris Aldrich, 1934
Admontia podomyia Brauer & Bergenstamm, 1889
Admontia pollinosa Curran, 1927
Admontia pyrenaica Tschorsnig & Pujade, 1997
Admontia rufochaeta Curran, 1927
Admontia seria (Meigen, 1824)
Admontia stackelbergi (Mesnil, 1963)
Admontia tarsalis Coquillett, 1898
Admontia washingtonae (Coquillett, 1895)
Admontia zimini (Mesnil, 1963)

References

Tachinidae genera
Exoristinae
Taxa named by Friedrich Moritz Brauer
Taxa named by Julius von Bergenstamm
Diptera of Europe
Diptera of North America